The South African Railways Class 10E2 of 1989 is an electric locomotive.

In 1989 and 1990, the South African Railways placed twenty-five Class 10E2 electric locomotives with a Co-Co wheel arrangement in mainline service.

Manufacturer

The 3 kV DC Class 10E2 electric locomotive was designed for the South African Railways (SAR) by Toshiba and built by Union Carriage and Wagon (UCW) in Nigel, Transvaal. Toshiba of Japan supplied the electrical equipment while UCW was responsible for the mechanical components and assembly.

The company did not allocate builder’s numbers to the locomotives it built for the SAR, but used the SAR unit numbers for their record keeping.

Characteristics
The Class 10E2 was introduced as a standard 3 kV DC heavy goods locomotive.

Brakes
The locomotive makes use of either regenerative or rheostatic braking, as the situation demands. Both traction and electric braking power are continuously variable, with the electric braking optimised to such an extent that maximum use will be made of the regenerative braking capacity of the  network, with the ability to automatically change over to rheostatic braking whenever the overhead supply system becomes non-receptive.

The entire fleet of the Class 10E family of electric locomotives is equipped with electronic chopper control, which is smoother in comparison to the rheostatic resistance control which was used in the Classes 1E to 6E1 electric locomotives.

Bogies
The Class 10E2 was built with sophisticated traction linkages on the bogies. Together with the locomotive's electronic wheel-slip detection system, these traction struts, mounted between the linkages on the bogies and the locomotive body and colloquially referred to as grasshopper legs, ensure the maximum transfer of power to the rails without causing wheel-slip by reducing the adhesion of the leading bogie and increasing that of the trailing bogie by as much as 15% upon starting.

Orientation
These dual cab locomotives have a roof access ladder on one side only, just to the right of the cab access door. The roof access ladder end is marked as the no. 2 end.

Identifying features
In visual appearance, the Class 10E2 can be distinguished from the Class 10E by the roof ends and the sills. The Class 10E has riffled roof ends and parts of the sill protrude slightly past the bottom edge of the body sides. The Class 10E2 has smooth unriffled roof ends and no part of the sill protrudes past the bottom edge of the body sides.

Service
The Class 10E2 is mainly employed to haul ore trains on the line between Kimberley and Hotazel in the Northern Cape. It also works between Kimberley and the Witwatersrand. Most were initially shedded at Kaserne near Johannesburg with several also at Beaconsfield near Kimberley.

In 1998, a number of Spoornet's electric locomotives and most of their Class 38-000 electro-diesel locomotives were sold to Maquarie-GETX (General Electric Financing) and leased back to Spoornet for a ten-year period which was to expire in 2008.

Liveries
All the Class 10E2 locomotives were delivered in the SAR red oxide livery with signal red buffer beams and cowcatchers and a yellow V stripe on the ends, folded over to a horizontal stripe below the side windows. The number plates on the sides were mounted without the traditional three-stripe yellow wings. In the late 1990s many were repainted in the Spoornet blue livery with outline numbers on the long hood sides. After 2008 in the Transnet Freight Rail (TFR) era, several received the TFR red, green and yellow livery.

On Class 10E2 units which were repainted in Transnet Freight Rail livery from c. 2011, the locomotive numbers are displayed as, for example, either "E10110" or "E10 125", instead of the earlier .

Illustration

References

3110
Co-Co locomotives
Union Carriage & Wagon locomotives
Toshiba locomotives
Cape gauge railway locomotives
Railway locomotives introduced in 1989
1989 in South Africa